Albert Lerat was a Belgian bobsledder who competed in the late 1940s. He won the silver medal in the four-man event at the 1947 FIBT World Championships in St. Moritz.

References
Bobsleigh four-man world championship medalists since 1930

Belgian male bobsledders
Possibly living people
Year of birth missing